Titas Bhowmik is an Indian actress who is known for playing the role of Kakoli in the Bengali television serial Tomay Amay Mile, and in the 2011 film Paglu,. To commemorate Shakespeare's birthday, she participated in an event where she performed a scene from Taming of the Shrew in Kolkata.

Bhowmik was married to the film actor Samadarshi Dutta.(M: 2014-2018).
In 2013 she participated in the most controversial popular reality show Bigg Boss Bangla 13.

Television
Taarey ami chokhey dekhini
Ghore Pherar Gaan as Rayna
Tomay Amay Mile as Kakoli ghosh
Dugga Dugga
Sanyashi Raja as Rani kosonoprobha.
Mahaprabhu Shree Chaitanya as Nimai's Mother.
Joy Baba Lokenath as Sudha
Meera
Kora Pakhi as Medha sinha

Film
Kadambari 2015
Paglu 2011

References

External links

Indian film actresses
Indian television actresses
Actresses from Kolkata
Living people
Actresses in Bengali cinema
Bengali television actresses
21st-century Indian actresses
Year of birth missing (living people)